Per Alton Dohm (May 14, 1938 – July 7, 2005) was a sailor who represented the United States Virgin Islands. He competed in the Finn event at the 1968 Summer Olympics.

Born into a sailing family, he ran a water taxi business in St. Thomas and was also the coach of the USVI sailing team. He coached Peter Holmberg to a silver medal in the 1988 Summer Olympics in the Finn event.

References

External links
 
 

1938 births
2005 deaths
United States Virgin Islands male sailors (sport)
Olympic sailors of the United States Virgin Islands
Sailors at the 1968 Summer Olympics – Finn
Sportspeople from Miami